Dinagat Sound is an arm of the Philippine Sea that separates the islands of Dinagat and Siargao, in the northeastern portion of Mindanao in the Philippines.

Sounds of the Philippines
Landforms of Dinagat Islands
Landforms of Surigao del Norte